Perambur railway station (station code: PER) is in Perambur, Chennai, one of the important stations in Chennai, in the Chennai Beach/Chennai Central–Arakkonam section of the Chennai Suburban Railway network. This passenger station serves the city railway colony with its Southern Railway Headquarters Hospital and works, which have their own stations, Perambur Carriage Works railway station and Perambur Loco Works railway station.

History

Perambur railway station is the second oldest railway station in the city after Royapuram railway station. The station was built in the 1860s to cater to employees at Southern Railway's locomotive, carriage, wagon, and coach-building workshops. The lines at the station were electrified on 29 November 1979, with the electrification of the Chennai Central–Tiruvallur section.

The station

As of 2013, the station is being used by about 40,000 commuters every day. About 140 suburban services and 29 long-distance trains halt at the station. Presently, the station has only one entrance to the northern side. It has another entry/exit passage near fourth platform.

Services

All of the suburban trains except train no. 66021  (Chennai Central–Tirupati fast local) passing through this station halt here, and many of the long-distance trains, have a stoppage at this station.

Workshop
Southern Railway's workshop is located here. This workshop was established in the year 1856 to serve the erstwhile Madras and Southern Mahratta Railway Company. It was a combined Locomotive, Carriage and Wagon POH & Coach building workshop and later bifurcated in 1932 to deal with Carriage & Wagon POH activity only, shifting the Locomotive overhaul activity to the new Loco workshop which was built adjacent to the original workshop. These two workshops are served by Perambur Carriage Works and Perambur Loco Works stations respectively. In 1951 the Southern Railway was formed by integrating the erstwhile South Indian Railway company, Madras & Southern Mahratta Railway Company, and Mysore State Railway with all their workshops and assets.

ICF

When the ICF shell division was started, furnishing works were done at this works for the new shells turned out by ICF. This activity was done from 1956 to 1963, until ICF furnishing division came out. From 1965 onwards the main activity of Carriage & Wagon POH were started and POH of Air conditioned coaches are being under taken since 1954.

Railways in Perambur is also noteworthy because of the visit of Mahatma Gandhi in 1933.

Development
In 2013, the station was being revamped at a cost of  12 million, with the work being expected to be completed in 6 months. As of 2013, work on extension of two platforms (platform nos. 2 and 3) is being undertaken to make them suitable for 12-compartment trains. Presently, these platforms can accommodate only nine-compartments trains. There is a new subway coming up in the east end of the station to ease the commuters.

Exclusive two-wheeler and car-parking facility have also been planned on 6,000 sq m. More water taps and coolers, seating arrangement, refreshment outlets and better illumination are part of the renovation. About 220 light will be installed. The dilapidated Government Railway Police (GRP) station will be shifted to a new building close to the station, and each platform will have a police help desk. Since April 2014, a new help desk for enquiries regarding arrival and departure of trains and filing cases against thefts, the first of its kind in a suburban railway station in the city, started functioning at the station.

See also
 Chennai Suburban Railway
 Railway stations in Chennai
 Integral Coach Factory
 Regional Railway Museum

Notes

References

Railway stations in Chennai
Stations of Chennai Suburban Railway